Hoy is a Mexican morning television show produced by Televisa and broadcast on Las Estrellas. Since its first broadcast, on August 3, 1998, the program had several stages. Being the longest-running program and the most watched on Mexican television in the morning. The sections focus on entertainment, horoscopes, the summary of soap operas, beauty, cooking, health, games, humor and music.

Presenters 

 
Contributors
Martha Figueroa (2016–present)
Mizada Mohamed (2000–2002, 2008–present)
Yogui (2016–present)
Kalinda Kano (2016–present)
Veronica Toussaint (2016–present)
Eduardo Salazar (2016–present)
César Lozano (2016–present)
Capi Albores (1998–2000, 2020–present)
Fernanda Centeno (2016–2020, 2021–present)
Sofia Villalobos (1998-2000, 2005-2008, 2019-present)

Former presenters and contributors 
 
Mauricio Mancera (2018–2019)
Pedro Prieto (2014-2020)
Yanet García (2018–2019)
Mhoni "Vidente" (2017–2019)
Natalia Téllez (2016–2019)
Maca Carriedo (2016–2018)
Rosa Concha  (2018-2020)
Chano Jurado (2016-2020)
Liz Torres (2015-2020)
Ricardo Margaleff (2016–2018)
Alfredo Gudini (2016–2018)
Alfredo Oropeza (2003–2018)
Alex Kaffie (2016–2018)
Reynaldo Rossano (2006–2013, 2016–2018)
Jorge Gaska (2013–2015)
Juan José Origel (2013–2015)
Héctor Sandarti (2013–2015)
Malillany Marín (2015)
Jan (2013–2015)
Adal Ramones (2015)
Shanik Berman (1990–2019)
Claudia de Icaza 
Samia (2020-2021)
Jorge Ugalde 
Alejandro Maldonado (2006-2009, 2013-2015)
Jesus Gibaja 
Dominika Paleta 
Pita Ojeda 
Morris 
Jessica Segura 
Yurem (2014–2015)
Jorge Ortiz de Pinedo 
Fortuna Dichi 
Santos Briz Fernandez 
Claudio Herrera
Alan Estrada (2012)
Alan Tacher (2011–2012)
Beng Zeng (2011)
Martha Carrillo (1998–2000, 2006–2007)
Angelica Maria (2008)
Alfredo Adame (1998–2002)
Flor Rubio 
Mara Patricia Castañeda 
Jorge Poza (2006–2007)
Leticia Calderón (2006–2007)
Talina Fernández (1998–1999)
Angélica Vale (2000)
Danna Paola (2003)
Laura Flores (2000–2003, 2008)
Diego Schoening (2000)
Arturo Peniche (2000-2003)
Antonio de Valdes 
Anette Cuburu (2008–2010)
Sofia Villalobos (1998-2000, 2006-2008)
Vielka Valenzuela (2005-2008)
Patrico Cabezut (2003–2008)
Fernanda Familiar (2000)
Gloria Calzada (2002)
Silvia Lomeli (2001–2004)
Juan José Ulloa (2000–2004)
Francisco Fortuño 
Anselmo Alonso 
Amina Blancarte
Martha Guzmán 
Carlos Eduardo Rico
Amira 
Horacio Villalobos (1998)
Miguel Gurwitz
Fabián Lavalle (2000-2002, 2008-2012)
Angie Pérez Dávila 
Ernesto Laguardia (2003–2011)
Anaís (2003–2005)
María Luisa Valdés Doria (2003-2005)
Francisco Ramírez 
Pablo Reinah 
Roxana Castellanos (2009–2012, 2018)
Alessandra Rosaldo (2012)
Mario Vanucchi (2011)
Gloria Aura (2013)
Penelope Menchaca (2004–2009) 
Denisse Padilla (2004–2006–2013)
Adriana Riveramelo (2000–2002)
Gabriela Ramírez (2002–2004)
Rodolfo Jiménez (2009–2013)
Rocío Cárdenas (2003–2004)
Arturo Carmona (2005–2009, 2020)

Segments

International release

References

External links

Hoy Official Website

1998 Mexican television series debuts
1990s Mexican television series
2000s Mexican television series
2010s Mexican television series
Breakfast television
Las Estrellas original programming
Live television series
Mexican television news shows
Spanish-language television shows